Roadside Picnic (Russian: , Piknik na obochine) is a philosophical science fiction novel by Soviet-Russian authors Arkady and Boris Strugatsky, written in 1971 and published in 1972. It is the brothers' most popular and most widely translated novel outside the former Soviet Union. As of 2003, Boris Strugatsky counted 55 publications of Roadside Picnic in 22 countries.

The story is published in English in a translation by Antonina W. Bouis. A preface to the first American edition was written by Theodore Sturgeon. Stanisław Lem wrote an afterword to the German edition of 1977.

The book has been the source of many adaptations and other inspired works in a variety of media, including stage plays, video games, and television series. The 1979 film Stalker, directed by Andrei Tarkovsky, is loosely based on the novel, with a screenplay written by the Strugatsky brothers.

The term stalker became a part of the Russian language and, according to the authors, became the most popular of their neologisms. In the book, stalkers are people who trespass into the forbidden area known as the Zone and steal its valuable extraterrestrial artifacts, which the stalkers sell. In Russian, after Tarkovsky's film, the term acquired the meaning of a guide who navigates forbidden or uncharted territories; later on, fans of industrial tourism, especially those visiting abandoned sites and ghost towns, were also called stalkers.

Setting
Roadside Picnic is set in the aftermath of an extraterrestrial event called the Visitation that simultaneously took place in several locations around the Earth over a two-day period. Neither the Visitors themselves nor their means of arrival or departure were ever seen by the local populations who lived inside the relatively small areas, each a few square kilometers, of the six Visitation Zones. The zones exhibit strange and dangerous phenomena not understood by humans, and contain artifacts with inexplicable properties. The title of the novel derives from an analogy proposed by the character Dr. Valentine Pilman, who compares the Visitation to a picnic:

In this analogy, the nervous animals are the humans who venture forth after the Visitors have left, discovering items and anomalies that are ordinary to those who have discarded them, but incomprehensible or deadly to the earthlings.

This explanation implies that the Visitors may not have paid any attention to, or even noticed, the human inhabitants of the planet during their visit, just as humans do not notice or pay attention to grasshoppers or ladybugs during a picnic. The artifacts and phenomena left behind by the Visitors in the Zones were garbage, discarded and forgotten, without any intentions to advance or damage humanity. There is little chance that the Visitors will return again because for them it was a brief stop, for reasons unknown, on the way to their actual destination.

Plot

Background

The novel is set in a post-visitation world where there are now six zones known on Earth that are full of unexplained phenomena and where strange happenings have briefly occurred, assumed to have been visitations by aliens. Governments and the UN, fearful of unforeseen consequences, try to keep tight control over them to prevent leakage of artifacts from the Zones. A subculture of stalkers, scavengers who go into the zones to steal the artifacts for profit, has evolved around the zones. The novel is set in and around a specific zone in Harmont, a fictitious town in an unspecified English-speaking country, and follows the protagonist over the course of eight years.

Introduction
The introduction is a live radio interview with Dr. Pilman who is credited with the discovery that the six Visitation Zones' locations were not random. He explains it so: "Imagine that you spin a huge globe and you start firing bullets into it. The bullet holes would lie on the surface in a smooth curve. The whole point (is that) all six Visitation Zones are situated on the surface of our planet as though someone had taken shots at Earth from a pistol located somewhere along the Earth–Deneb line. Deneb is the main star in Cygnus."

Section 1
The story revolves around Redrick "Red" Schuhart, a tough and experienced young stalker who regularly enters the Zone illegally at night in search of valuable artifacts for profit. Trying to clean up his act, he becomes employed as a lab assistant at the International Institute, which studies the Zone. To help the career of his boss, whom he considers a friend, he goes into the Zone with him on an official expedition to recover a unique artifact (a full "empty"), which leads to his friend's death later on. This comes as a great shock when the news reaches Redrick, drunk in a bar, and he blames himself for his friend's fate. While Redrick is at the bar, a police force enters looking for stalkers. Redrick is forced to use a "shrieker" to make a hasty getaway. Red's girlfriend Guta is pregnant and decides to keep the baby no matter what. It is widely rumored that incursions into the Zone by stalkers carry high risk of mutations in their children, even though no radiation or other mutagens had been detected in the area. They decide to marry.

Section 2
Disillusioned Redrick returns to stalking. In the course of his joint expedition into the Zone with a fellow stalker named Burbridge (a.k.a. "The Vulture"), the latter steps into a substance known as "hell slime," which slowly dissolves his leg bones. Amputation must be urgently performed in order to avoid Burbridge losing his legs entirely. Redrick pulls Burbridge out of the Zone and drops him off at a surgeon, avoiding the patrols. Later on Redrick is confronted by Burbridge's daughter, who gets angry at him for saving her father. Guta has given birth to a happy and intelligent daughter, fully normal but for having long, light full body hair and black eyes. They lovingly call her the "Monkey". Redrick meets with his clients in a posh hotel, selling them a fresh portion of the Zone artifacts, but what they are really after is "hell slime". It is hinted that they want it for military research. Redrick claims he does not have it yet and leaves. Shortly afterward Redrick is arrested, but escapes. He then contacts his clients, telling them where he hid the "slime" sample that he had smuggled out previously. Redrick insists that all the proceeds from the sale be sent to Guta. He realizes that the "slime" will be used for some kind of weapon of mass destruction, but decides he has to provide for his family. He then gives himself up to the police.

Section 3
Redrick's old friend Richard Noonan (a supply contractor with offices inside the institute), is revealed as a covert operative of an unnamed, presumably governmental, secret organization working to stop the contraband outflow of artifacts from the Zone. Believing that he's nearing the successful completion of his multi-year assignment, he is confronted and scolded by his boss, who reveals to him that the flow is stronger than ever, and is tasked with finding who is responsible and how they operate. It is revealed that the stalkers are now organized under the cover of the "weekend picnics-for-tourists" business set up by Burbridge. They jokingly refer to the setup as "Sunday school". Noonan meets with Dr. Valentine Pilman for lunch and they have an in-depth discussion of the Visitation and humanity in general. This is where the idea of "Visitation as a roadside picnic" is articulated. Redrick is home again, having served his time. Burbridge visits him regularly, trying to entice him into some secret project, but Redrick declines. Guta is depressed because their daughter has nearly lost her humanity and ability to speak, more and more resembling an actual monkey. Redrick's dead father is also present, having come home from the cemetery inside the Zone, as other very slow-moving (and completely harmless) reanimated dead are now returning to their homes all around town. They are usually destroyed by the authorities as soon as they are discovered; Redrick, however, had forcibly managed to defend his father from being taken away.

Section 4
Redrick goes into the Zone one last time in order to reach the wish-granting "Golden Sphere." He has a map, given to him by Burbridge, whose son, Arthur, joins him on the expedition. Redrick knows one of them has to die in order to temporarily deactivate a phenomenon known as the "meatgrinder" in order for the other to reach the sphere, but he keeps this a secret from Arthur, whom he intends to sacrifice to it in order to make a wish to turn his daughter back to normal. After they get to the location, surviving many obstacles, Arthur rushes towards the sphere shouting out selfless wishes for a better world, only to be savagely dispatched by the meatgrinder. With the "Golden Sphere" in front of him, an exhausted Redrick looks back in confusion and bitterness on his whole life of desperate survival in a harsh world, his servitude and lack of free will, and finds that he cannot articulate what he actually wants from the sphere. After much unaccustomed introspection, Red at first leaves it to the Sphere to look into his untainted soul "to figure out" his wish, because "it can't be bad", effectively making his wish that there is something left in him that would wish for good. In irony he winds up obsessing in the same way the boy had. "HAPPINESS FOR EVERYBODY, FREE, AND MAY NO ONE BE LEFT BEHIND!"

History
The story was written by the Strugatsky brothers in 1971. The first outlines were written January 18–27 in Leningrad, and the final version was completed between October 28 and November 3 in Komarovo. It was first published in the literary magazine Avrora in 1972, issues 7–10. Parts of it (Section 1) were published in Volume 25 of the Library of Modern Science Fiction in 1973. A Russian-language version endorsed by the Strugatsky brothers as the original was published in the 1970s.

By 1998, 38 editions of the novel had been published in 20 countries. The novel was first translated into English by Antonina W. Bouis. The preface to the first American edition of the novel (Macmillan., New York, 1977) was written by Theodore Sturgeon.

In 2012, the novel was re-released in English. This was not only re-translated, but based on a version restored by Boris Strugatsky to the original state before the Soviet censors made their alterations.

Awards and nominations
The novel was nominated for a John W. Campbell Award for best science fiction novel of 1978 and won second place.
In 1978, the Strugatskys were accepted as honorary members of the Mark Twain Society for their "outstanding contribution to world science fiction literature."
A 1979, Scandinavian congress on science fiction literature awarded the Swedish translation the Jules Verne prize for best novel of the year published in Swedish.
In 1981, at the sixth Festival du Science Fiction in Metz, France the novel won the award for best foreign book of the year.

Adaptations and cultural influence
 A 1977 Czechoslovak TV miniseries Návštěva z Vesmíru (Visit from Space). After its TV premiere, all copies were destroyed by censors.
 A 1979 science fiction film, Stalker, directed by Andrei Tarkovsky, with a screenplay written by Boris and Arkady Strugatsky, is loosely based on the novel. 
 While not a direct adaptation, the video game series S.T.A.L.K.E.R. is heavily influenced by Roadside Picnic. The first game in the series, S.T.A.L.K.E.R.: Shadow of Chernobyl, references many important plot points from the book, such as the wish granter and the unknown force blocking the path to the center of the zone. It also contains elements such as anomalies and artifacts that are similar to those described in the book, but that are created by a supernatural ecological disaster, not by alien visitors. 
The book is referenced in the post-apocalyptic video game Metro 2033. A character shuffles through a shelf of books in a ruined library and finds Roadside Picnic, he states that it is "something familiar". Metro 2033 was created by individuals who had worked on S.T.A.L.K.E.R. before founding their own video game development company. The game was based on a novel of the same name which also took influence from Roadside Picnic.
 The 1992 video game Star Control II references alien visitations with mysterious effects and the mosquito mange regarding the disappearance of the Androsynth.
 In 2003, the Finnish theater company Circus Maximus produced a stage version of Roadside Picnic, called Stalker. Authorship of the play was credited to the Strugatskys and to Mikko Viljanen and Mikko Kanninen.
 A tabletop role-playing game in 2012 titled Stalker was developed by Ville Vuorela of Burger Games.
 M. John Harrison's novel Nova Swing (2007), which features a location called the 'Event Zone' where reality is skewed in various ways, can be seen to be influenced by Roadside Picnic.
 A Finnish low-budget indie film Vyöhyke (Zone), directed by Esa Luttinen, was released in 2012. The film is set in a Finnish visitation zone, and refers to material in the novel as well as the Tarkovsky film.
 British progressive rock band Guapo's 2013 album History of the Visitation, is based on the novel.
 The original Chinese title of the 2015 film Kaili Blues by director Bi Gan literally translates to "Roadside Picnic", which is the name of a book of poems written by Chen Sheng, one of the characters in the film. Bi Gan is heavily influenced by Andrei Tarkovsky, especially his film Stalker.
 In 2016, the US TV channel WGN America ordered a pilot for a TV adaptation, starring Matthew Goode and directed by Alan Taylor, but did not proceed to a series order.
 The 2016 video game The Final Station is partly based on the book, in which an alien "Visitation" occurred across several countries in the game. The Visitation devastated human society but also left some advanced technology to humanity.
 The documentary HyperNormalisation by Adam Curtis discusses the book and its role in questioning the realism of Soviet society.
Japanese writer Iori Miyazawa's 2017 Otherside Picnic is a novel, manga and anime series in which two girls explore the "Otherside", a world of urban legend populated by ghosts of folklore.
 Annihilation, a 2018 science fiction psychological horror film, written and directed by Alex Garland, though based on the novel of the same name by Jeff VanderMeer, for some critics betrays obvious similarities to Roadside Picnic and Stalker.
 A skirmish wargame published in 2020 titled Zona Alfa featuring "skirmish rules for scavenging, exploring, and surviving in a near-future, post-apocalyptic Eastern European setting" in which players can "take on the role of bandits, mercenaries, and military units fighting over the blasted Exclusion Zone and its abandoned artefacts" was developed by Patrick Todoroff for Osprey Publishing.
A VR game called Into The Radius is often compared to the VR equivalent of the S.T.A.L.K.E.R. series and is heavily influenced by the book.
The Amazon Prime series Tales from the Loop, based on the book of the same title by Simon Stålenhag, is based on a similar premise to Roadside Picnic. In the series, there are many artefacts and phenomena scattered across the rural area surrounding the fictional town of Mercer, Ohio, which serve as critical plot devices. Abandoned metal spheres exhibiting strange effects lie abandoned in the woods; forest streams become inexplicably frozen or unfrozen, with time-altering effects; inter-dimensional rifts open and close; and an otherworldly, floating sphere, pulsing with seismic energy, is the target of scientific scrutiny. Each of these creates challenges for the characters, who seem at once bemused at, and accepting of, their existence.
 British-American 2021 science fiction television series Debris explores a similar premise.

References

External links
 Roadside Picnic, full English text (Antonina W. Bouis translation), archive at the Internet Archive Wayback Machine
 Roadside Picnic, parallel text in Russian and English
 Review of the Roadside Picnic on the Infinity Plus website
 The SF Site Featured Review: Roadside Picnic
 Stanisław Lem about Roadside Picnic

1972 novels
1972 science fiction novels
1972 in the Soviet Union
Fiction set around Deneb
Novels by Arkady and Boris Strugatsky
Post-apocalyptic novels
Books with cover art by Richard M. Powers
Russian novels adapted into films
Russian novels adapted into television shows
Russian novels adapted into plays
Novels set in the future
Dystopian novels